Zaporizhzhia-1 Railway Station is the main train station in Zaporizhzhia, Ukraine.

The first station was built in 1873 during the construction of the Lozova-Sevastopol railway.

The new station building was opened on September 25, 1954. The commissioning of the station was planned a year earlier, but since the construction was delayed, the inscription "1953" appears on the facade.

References 

Railway stations in Zaporizhzhia Oblast
Railway stations opened in 1873